is a television series featuring congregational Christian singing in the Welsh language. Currently broadcast by the Welsh-language television channel S4C, it is one of the longest-running television programmes on any British television channel, the first edition having been broadcast by the BBC from Trinity Chapel, Swansea, on 1 January 1961. The programme inspired the creation of the similar English-language series Songs of Praise, which began later in the same year.

The programmes celebrate important festivals and dates in the Christian calendar and place on film the celebration of important national and international occasions where the music is of a devotional and religious nature.

Production
The programme was produced in-house by BBC Cymru Wales until 1993 when production was awarded to independent company Intrada. In 1998 Teledu Elidir took over production and Avanti Media was awarded the contract in 2006. The production was re-tendered in 2017 and it was awarded to Rondo Media (known from producing soap opera Rownd a Rownd).

References

External links

BBC Television shows
S4C original programming
Welsh-language television shows
1961 British television series debuts
1960s British television series
1970s British television series
1980s British television series
1990s British television series
2000s British television series
2010s British television series
2020s British television series
Television series about Christianity
Christian mass media in the United Kingdom
British religious television series